Dao County is a county in Hunan Province, China, it is under the administration of Yongzhou prefecture-level City.

Located on the southern margin of the province, it is adjacent to the northeastern border of Guangxi. The county borders to the northeast by Shuangpai County, to the east by Ningyuan County, to the south by Jianghua County, to the southwest by Jiangyong County, to the northwest and the north by Guanyang and Quanzhou Counties of Guangxi. The county has 11 towns, four townships and 7 subdistricts under its jurisdiction, the county seat is Lianxi.

History
Forces of the Taiping Rebellion stopped by Daozhou on their way to Changsha and Wuchang, Hubei. They convinced 20,000 locals to join the rebellion.

The Dao County Massacre of 1967

The 1967 mass killing in Dao County, known as the Dao County Massacre, lasted 66 days from August 13 to October 17, 1967. It resulted in 4,519 dead, of whom 4,193 were killed outright and 326 were forced to commit suicide.

There are two principal features of this massacre. The first one is that it took place during the Cultural Revolution. The other is that nearly 90 percent of the victims were labeled as "class enemies", i.e., the so-called Black Five Categories (landlords, rich peasants, counter-revolutionaries, "bad elements," and rightists) and their family members.

Administrative divisions
7 subdistricts
 Dongmen
 Futang
 Lianxi
 Shangguan
 Wanjiazhuang
 Xizhou
 Yingjiang

11 towns
 Baimadu
 Baimangpu
 Ganziyuan
 Gongba
 Meihua
 Qiaotou
 Qingtang
 Shouyan
 Simaqiao
 Xianglinpu
 Xianzijiao

1 township
 Lefutang

3 Yao ethnic township
 Hengling
 Hongtangying
 Zhangyitang

Transport
Luoyang–Zhanjiang Railway

Climate

See also
 Fuyan Cave
 Yuchanyan Cave

References
www.xzqh.org

External links 
 

 
County-level divisions of Hunan
Yongzhou